The May 1996 Kentucky tornado outbreak was a small outbreak of tornadoes that occurred in Central and northern Kentucky on May 28, 1996. The outbreak resulted in over $100 million in damages.

Southern Louisville suburbs tornado

After touching down, the tornado passed over I-65 at the Brooks exit where it overturned five tractor-trailers and damaged an Arby's, a Cracker Barrel, and a Budgetel Inn.  From there it moved east through the towns of Pioneer Village, Hillview, and Mount Washington at F4 intensity.  The tornado, at times half a mile wide, then proceeded into Spencer County where it narrowly missed the county seat of Taylorsville before finally, after thirty miles and over an hour of destruction, it dissipated near Little Mount.

More than a thousand homes were damaged or destroyed, with the value of property damaged estimated at over US$100 million (1996 dollars). Many of these homes were large, expensive, and well-built.  In spite of all the destruction, only ten injuries occurred, with the worst injury being a man treated for broken ribs. This tornado was later rated EF4 on the Enhanced Fujita scale in 2022.

See also
List of North American tornadoes and tornado outbreaks

References

External links
Case study of tornadoes

F4 tornadoes by date
Kentucky,1996-05-28
Tornadoes of 1996
Bullitt County, Kentucky
History of Louisville, Kentucky
Tornadoes in Kentucky
1996 in Kentucky
May 1996 events in the United States